David Lewis (born September 8, 1958) is an American singer-songwriter who was the lead singer/guitarist for R&B band Atlantic Starr.  He left the band in 1994 to return to his Christian roots.  He and his wife Marian, a (former high fashion model with the Ford Modeling Agency), are the co-founders of Into the Light Ministries, a Christ-centered, non-denominational ministry. Ministering through music and testimony, they travel all over the globe sharing their love for the one who as they put it, "brought them out of darkness into His marvelous light."
 
Lewis wrote, produced, arranged, and performed chart-topping singles, such as "Always," "Secret Lovers," and "Masterpiece."

References

External links

1958 births
Living people
20th-century American singers
American male singer-songwriters
American gospel singers
Atlantic Starr members
20th-century American male singers
American singer-songwriters